Burnham Martin (August 10, 1811 – November 17, 1882) was a Vermont lawyer, farmer and politician who served as the 22nd lieutenant governor of Vermont from 1858 to 1860.

Early life
Burnham Martin was born in Williamstown, Vermont on August 10, 1811.  He was trained as a saddler and worked in Saratoga Springs, New York and Fayette County, Ohio in the 1830s and 1840s, also teaching school and studying law.  After attaining admission to the bar, Martin joined the Whigs and served as Fayette County State's Attorney from 1841 to 1843.  He was a member of the Ohio House of Representatives from 1843 to 1845, and he served in the Ohio Senate from 1845 to 1847.

Martin subsequently returned to Vermont.  He settled in Chelsea, where he practiced law and farmed, also serving in local offices for most of his life, including Chelsea Justice of the Peace, Orange County State's Attorney from 1849 to 1850 and 1853, and County Clerk from 1857 to 1858.

Political career
In 1857 Martin represented Chelsea in the Vermont House of Representatives.

He was elected Lieutenant Governor as a Republican and served from 1858 to 1860.

Martin served in the Vermont Senate from 1866 to 1867.

From 1872 until his death he served as Chelsea's Town Clerk.  In 1876 Martin served again in the Vermont House of Representatives.

Later life
Martin was a member of the Bennington Battle Monument Commission and was active in the Orange County Agricultural Society, serving as its Secretary.

Death and burial
Burnham Martin died in Chelsea on November 17, 1882.  He was buried in Williamstown's West Hill Cemetery.

Other
In 1867 at a speech at the agricultural fair in  Tunbridge, Vermont, Martin described the event as a "little World's Fair". This name was soon adopted as the official name of the annual fair that is still held to this day. This event is recorded on a historical marker on the edge of the fairgrounds in Tunbridge.

Martin's first name appears variously as "Burnham" or "Burnam."  It is spelled "Burnham" on his gravestone.

Photo gallery

References 

1811 births
1882 deaths
Ohio Whigs
Members of the Ohio House of Representatives
Ohio state senators
Vermont Whigs
Vermont Republicans
Vermont lawyers
State's attorneys in Vermont
Members of the Vermont House of Representatives
Vermont state senators
Lieutenant Governors of Vermont
People from Chelsea, Vermont
Burials in Vermont
19th-century American politicians
19th-century American lawyers